Eric Jay Dolin (born 1961) is an American author who writes history books, which often focus on maritime topics, wildlife, and the environment. He has published fourteen books, which have won numerous awards.

Education
Dolin grew up near the coasts of New York and Connecticut, and graduated from Brown University, where he majored in biology and environmental studies.  After getting a master's degree in environmental management from the Yale School of Forestry and Environmental Studies,  he received his Ph.D. in environmental policy and planning from the Massachusetts Institute of Technology.

Family
Eric and his wife Jennifer live in Marblehead, Massachusetts, with their two children.

Career
Dolin has worked as: (a) program manager at the U.S. Environmental Protection Agency; (b) environmental consultant for (i) Booz Allen Hamilton (MD) and (ii) Environmental Resources Limited (London); (c) an intern (i) at National Wildlife Federation, (ii) at the Massachusetts Office of Coastal Zone Management, and (iii) for Senator Lowell P. Weicker, Jr. on Capitol Hill; (d) fisheries policy analyst at the National Marine Fisheries Service; (e) technical writer for the National Transportation Safety Board; (f) PEW research fellow at Harvard Law School; and (g) American Association for the Advancement of Science Mass Media Science and Engineering Fellow at Business Week. Since 2007, he has been a full-time writer.

Bibliography
A Furious Sky: The Five-Hundred-Year History of America's Hurricanes (Liveright, an imprint of W. W. Norton, June 2020)
Black Flags, Blue Waters: The Epic History of America's Most Notorious Pirates (Liveright, an imprint of W. W. Norton, 2018, 400 pp., 120 illus., 
Brilliant Beacons: A History of the American Lighthouse (Liveright, an imprint of W. W. Norton, 2016, 560 pp., 160 illus.).
When America First Met China: An Exotic History of Tea, Drugs, and Money in the Age of Sail (Liveright Publishing Corporation, 2012, 384 pp., 102 illus.)
Fur, Fortune, and Empire: The Epic History of the Fur Trade in America (W. W. Norton, 2010, 464 pp., 90 illus.)
Leviathan: The History of Whaling In America (W. W. Norton, 2007, 480 pp., 90 illus.)
The Ph.D. Survival Guide  (iUniverse, 2005, 140 pp.)
Political Waters: The Long, Dirty, Contentious, Incredibly Expensive but Eventually Triumphant History of Boston Harbor - A Unique Environmental Success Story (University of Massachusetts Press, 2004, 240 pp., 40 illus.)
Snakehead: A Fish out of Water (Smithsonian Books, 2003, 266 pp., 58 illus.)
Smithsonian Book of National Wildlife Refuges (Illustrations by John and Karen Hollingsworth, Smithsonian Books, 2003, 258 pp., 200 illus.)
The Duck Stamp Story: Art-Conservation-History (co-author, Bob Dumaine, Krause Publications, 2000, 206 pp., 300 illus.)
International Environmental Treaty Making (co-authored with Lawrence E. Susskind and J. William Breslin; Program on Negotiation Books, Harvard Law School, 1992, 192 pp.)
Dirty Water Clean Water: A Chronology of Events Surrounding the Degradation and Cleanup of Boston Harbor (MIT Sea Grant College Program, 1990, 144 pp.)
The U.S. Fish and Wildlife Service (Know your government) (Chelsea House Publishers, 1989)

Awards
Black Flags, Blue Waters: The Epic History of America's Most Notorious Pirates was chosen as a "Must-Read" book for 2019 by the Massachusetts Center for the Book; as a finalist for the 2019 Julia Ward Howe Award given by the Boston Author's Club; and it was selected by Goodreads as one of September's top five History/Biography titles recommended in their monthly New Releases e-mail.

Brilliant Beacons: A History of the American Lighthouse was chosen by Captain and Classic Boat Best Nautical Book of 2016.

When America First Met China: An Exotic History of Tea, Drugs, and Money in the Age of Sail was chosen by Kirkus Reviews as one of the top 100 nonfiction books for 2012; won a gold medal for history in the 2013 Independent Publisher Book Awards; and was chosen by the Boston Author's Club as a "Highly Recommended Book."

Fur, Fortune, and Empire: The Epic History of the Fur Trade in America won the 2010 James P. Hanlan Book Award, given by the New England Historical Association;   a bronze medal for history in the 2011 Independent Publisher Book Awards;   and was awarded first place in the Outdoor Writers Association of America, Excellence in Craft Contest.

Leviathan: The History of Whaling in America won the 2007 John Lyman Award for U.S. Maritime History; the twenty-third annual L. Byrne Waterman Award, given by the New Bedford Whaling Museum, for outstanding contributions to whaling research and history; a silver medal in the 2008 Independent Publisher Book Awards.

The Duck Stamp Story: Art, Conservation, History (Krause Publications, 2000) won the gold medal for books at the 2001 American Philatelic Society Stampshow.

Dolin has been awarded an E. Geoffrey and Elizabeth Thayer Verney Fellowship, Nantucket Historical Association (2005); a Martin Environmental Fellowship, MIT (1990–1991); a Switzer Environmental Fellowship (1990–1991 and 1989–1990)l and a C.V. Starr Fellowship for National Service, Brown University (1982–1983). And in 2007, the Intergovernmental Panel on Climate Change presented Dolin with a certificate recognizing his contribution to the joint award of the Nobel Peace Prize for 2007 to the IPCC.

References

External links

American male writers
Living people
1961 births